Philip Kent Grey, 7th Earl Grey (born 11 May 1940) is a British naval pilot and hereditary peer. His father, Albert Harry George Campbell Grey, was born in Ottawa, Ontario and served as Trooper with the Canadian Armoured Corps when he was killed in 1942.

His great-great-grandfather George (1809–1891) was the fourth son of Charles Grey, 2nd Earl Grey, Prime Minister of the United Kingdom. He had an elder brother, Richard, who succeeded to the peerage in 1963, following the death of Charles Grey, 5th Earl Grey, their second cousin twice removed.

Philip Grey succeeded his brother in 2013, becoming the 7th Earl Grey.

In 1968, he married Ann Catherine Applegate, with whom he has two children: Alexander Edward, Viscount Howick (born 20 December 1968) and Lady Vanessa Catherine (born 1975). The family lives at Kingsbridge, Devon.

References

Earls Grey
1940 births
Living people
People from Watford
English people of Canadian descent